Samuel Wilkins II (born c. 1673) was an accuser in the Salem witch trials. He was the son of Henry Wilkins, and thus the grandson of Bray Wilkins and nephew of John Wilkins and Margaret Wilkins Knight, two other accusers. He testified against his cousin-in-law, John Willard.

References

Accusers in witch trials
People of colonial Massachusetts
People of the Salem witch trials
1670s births
Year of birth uncertain
Year of death unknown